was a Japanese comedy-action police TV series. It starred regulars Yūzō Kayama, Masaya Oki, Tatsuya Fuji, Naomi Hase, and Kyohei Shibata, with Fumio Watanabe as a semi-regular. It ran for twenty-six episodes in 1978 and won popularity. It is noted for the ad-libbing and jokes by the cast and staff, which became more frequent as the show wore on.

Kyohei Shibata appeared as regular cast for the first time in TV drama series.

The final episode was directed by Toru Murakawa who was simultaneously directing the film Satsujin Yūgi featuring Yūsaku Matsuda and Yutaka Nakajima, and thus pulled them in for cameo roles.

Cast
Yūzō Kayama as Eiichi Nitta
Tatsuya Fuji as Shinsuke Mizuhara
Masaya Oki as Shiro Yabuki
Kyōhei Shibata (actor) as Minoru Takimoto
Naomi Hase as Kayoko Yuki
Fumio Watanabe as Iwao Takaoka

Episodes
1. Haienaga Atsumatta directed by Yasuharu Hasebe
2. Snaipah no Megahikaku directed by Yasuharu Hasebe
3. Akujo ga Odoru directed by Tōru Murakawa
4. Dono wo Ute directed by Tōru Murakawa
5. Sennyu Keiji directed by Yasuharu Hasebe
6 .Waruwa Nemurasero directed  by Yasuharu Hasebe
7. Satsutaba to Akaibara directed by Tōru Murakawa
8. Hissino Tsuiso directed by Tōru Murakawa
9. Genkin Yusousha Godatsu directed by Yukihiro Sawada
10. Mimi directed by Yukihiro Sawada
11. Mehyoga Tanda directed by Yukio Noda
12. Koroshiya ni Hakaganai directed by Yukio Noda
13. Yokohama Chinpirabugi directed by Tōru Murakawa
14. Daigyakuten directed by Tōru Murakawa
15. Kuroikage directed by Ken Matsumori
16. Bōkōma W directed by Kiyoshi Nishimura
17. Koroshiya directed by Kiyoshi Nishimura
18. Lady killer directed by Ken Matsumori
19. Gofuyona Teishu Shimatsushimasu directed by Kazutaka Sakurai
20. Hinomaru Gurentai directed by Kazutaka Sakurai
21. Kikenna Highway directed by Kiyoshi Nishimura
22. Jyunoko no Mystery zone directed by Kiyoshi Nishimura
23. Satsujin Wanted directed by Keiichi Ozawa
24. Bōsatsuma directed by Keiichi Ozawa
25. Yokohama connection directed by Yōnosuke Koike
26. Sayonara wa Dangande directed by Tōru Murakawa

References

Links
Information and episode guide (in Japanese)

Japanese drama television series
 Japanese police procedural television series
Detective television series
Japanese detective television drama series